Eric Hugh Mackenzie (born August 29, 1932) is a Canadian retired professional baseball player.

Mackenzie's career extended from 1951 to 1958 and included 632 games played, all but 105 of them in the Athletics' organisation.  He signed with them when the team was still based in Philadelphia, and made his debut and lone appearance with them during their inaugural season in Kansas City. On April 23, 1955, against the Chicago White Sox at Municipal Stadium, he pinch hit for A's catcher Joe Astroth in the eighth inning against pitcher Harry Dorish and grounded out to second baseman Nellie Fox.  Mackenzie stayed in the game and caught the ninth inning.  Chicago thrashed Kansas City, 29–6.  Mackenzie then split the remainder of the season between the Class A Savannah Athletics and the Class B Lancaster Red Roses.

He currently lives in Bright's Grove, Ontario, Canada.

References

External links 
 Baseball Reference page on Eric Mackenzie
 Eric Mackenzie Baseball Stats by Baseball Almanac

1932 births
Amarillo Gold Sox players
Baseball people from Alberta
Binghamton Triplets players
Canadian expatriate baseball players in the United States
Columbia Gems players
Kansas City Athletics players
Lancaster Red Roses players
Living people
Major League Baseball catchers
Major League Baseball players from Canada
Rome Colonels players
St. Hyacinthe A's players
Savannah A's players
Tarboro A's players